HMAS Bungaree was an auxiliary minelayer of Royal Australian Navy (RAN), serving during World War II. The ship was built as a cargo vessel for the Adelaide Steamship Company by Caledon Shipbuilding & Engineering Company at Dundee, and launched in 1937. The ship operated in Australian waters and was requisitioned by the RAN in October 1940. Decommissioned on 7 August 1946 and returned to her owners on 5 November 1947, she was sold in 1957 and renamed Dampier. She was then sold in 1960 and renamed Eastern Mariner and while operating in South Vietnamese waters she struck a mine on the Saigon River and was sunk on 26 May 1966. She was salvaged by a Japanese company and subsequently scrapped in 1968.

Construction and design
Bungaree was built in 1937 for the Adelaide Steamship Company by Caledon Shipbuilding & Engineering Company at Dundee, and named after the Aboriginal community leader and explorer Bungaree.

She had a crew of 175 personnel and was powered by a triple-expansion steam engine and low pressure geared turbine producing a total 2,500 hp, which gave the vessel a top speed of 11 knots. In RAN service, the vessel was armed with two 4-inch guns, one 12-pounder gun, four 20 mm Oerlikons, and two machine guns for self defence.

Operational history
The civilian merchant freighter Bungaree was requisitioned by the RAN in October 1940, and was commissioned into the RAN on 9 June 1941 after being converted into a minelayer. Following her conversion, HMAS Bungaree had a capacity of 423 naval mines. She was later modified to carry 467 mines. Bungaree laid her first minefield off Port Moresby in August 1941 and, as Australia's only minelayer, laid over 10,000 mines in defensive minefields in Australian and New Zealand waters during World War II. Bungaree was present in Sydney Harbour during the Japanese midget submarine attack on 31 May 1942. As the Allies moved onto the offensive the need for defensive minefields lessened, with Bungaree re-tasked as a survey ship from January 1944 and a store ship from August 1944.

Bungaree was awarded the battle honour "Pacific 1942–43" for her wartime service.

Decommissioning and fate
HMAS Bungaree was decommissioned on 7 August 1946 and was returned to her owners on 5 November 1947. The mines she laid in Australian waters were swept by the RAN between 1945 and 1948. She was sold in 1957 to a company based out of Hong Kong and renamed Dampier. In 1960 she was sold again, and renamed Eastern Mariner. The vessel was lost on 26 May 1966, after striking a mine in the Saigon River, South Vietnam. The ship was later salvaged by a Japanese company and briefly renamed Kitagawa Maru before being scrapped in 1968.

Citations

References

External links

Merchant ships of Australia
Ships built in Dundee
1937 ships
Minelayers of the Royal Australian Navy
Survey ships of the Royal Australian Navy
Cargo ships of the Royal Australian Navy
World War II minelayers of Australia
World War II auxiliary ships of Australia
Ships sunk by mines
Maritime incidents in 1966